SGP may refer to:

Events
 Secret Garden Party, a UK music festival
 Speedway Grand Prix, a series of motorcycling contests
 Symposium on Geometry Processing, of European Association For Computer Graphics

Organisations
 Reformed Political Party (Staatkundig Gereformeerde Partij, SGP), the Netherlands
 Simmering-Graz-Pauker, an Austrian company, now part of Siemens
 Simply Good Production Russian video production agency based in Moscow
 Socialist Equality Party (Sozialistische Gleichheitspartei), Germany
 Sociedad de Gestión de Productores Fonográficos del Paraguay, a Paraguayan phonographic industry organisation
 Society of General Physiologists
 Stockland Corporation Limited, a diversified Australian property development company traded on ASX as SGP
 Scottish Green Party, Scotland

Science
 Simplified General Perturbations model, for orbital calculations
 Social Golfer Problem, a problem in discrete mathematics

Other uses 
 SGP, the ISO 3166-1 alpha-3 country code for Singapore
 sgp, the ISO 639-3 code for the Singpho dialect
 Shay Gap Airport, IATA airport code "SGP"
 Schweizer SGP 1-1, an American glider
 Stability and Growth Pact, the main EU fiscal agreement
 Subaru Global Platform, unibody automobile platform
 SpaceGhostPurrp, American rapper and record producer